Ivar I. Ekeland (born 2 July 1944, Paris) is a French mathematician of Norwegian descent. Ekeland has written influential monographs and textbooks on nonlinear functional analysis, the calculus of variations, and mathematical economics, as well as popular books on mathematics, which have been published in French, English, and other languages. Ekeland is known as the author of Ekeland's variational principle and for his use of the Shapley–Folkman lemma in optimization theory. He has contributed to the periodic solutions of Hamiltonian systems and particularly to the theory of Kreĭn indices for linear systems (Floquet theory). Ekeland helped to inspire the discussion of chaos theory in Michael Crichton's 1990 novel Jurassic Park.

Biography
Ekeland studied at the École Normale Supérieure (1963–1967). He is a senior research fellow at the French National Centre for Scientific Research (CNRS). He obtained his doctorate in 1970. He teaches mathematics and economics at the Paris Dauphine University, the École Polytechnique, the École Spéciale Militaire de Saint-Cyr, and the University of British Columbia in Vancouver. He was the chairman of Paris-Dauphine University from 1989 to 1994.

Ekeland is a recipient of the D'Alembert Prize and the Jean Rostand prize. He is also a member of the Norwegian Academy of Science and Letters.

Popular science: Jurassic Park by Crichton and Spielberg

Ekeland has written several books on popular science, in which he has explained parts of dynamical systems,  chaos theory, and probability theory. These books were first written in French and then translated into English and other languages, where they received praise for their mathematical accuracy as well as their value as literature and as entertainment.

Through these writings, Ekeland had an influence on  Jurassic Park, on both the novel and film. Ekeland's Mathematics and the unexpected and James Gleick's Chaos inspired the discussions of chaos theory in the novel Jurassic Park by Michael Crichton. When the novel was adapted for the film Jurassic Park by Steven Spielberg, Ekeland and Gleick were consulted by the actor Jeff Goldblum as he prepared to play the  mathematician specializing in chaos theory.

Research
Ekeland has contributed to mathematical analysis, particularly to variational calculus and mathematical optimization.

Variational principle
In mathematical analysis, Ekeland's variational principle, discovered by Ivar Ekeland, is a theorem that asserts that there exist a nearly optimal solution to a class of optimization problems.

Ekeland's variational principle can be used when the lower level set of a minimization problem is not compact, so that the Bolzano–Weierstrass theorem can not be applied. Ekeland's principle relies on the completeness of the metric space.

Ekeland's principle leads to a quick proof of the Caristi fixed point theorem.

Ekeland was associated with the University of Paris when he proposed this theorem.

Variational theory of Hamiltonian systems
Ivar Ekeland is an expert on variational analysis, which studies mathematical optimization of spaces of functions. His research on periodic solutions of Hamiltonian systems and particularly to the theory of Kreĭn indices for linear systems (Floquet theory) was described in his monograph.

Additive optimization problems

Ekeland explained the success of methods of convex minimization on large problems that appeared to be non-convex.  In many optimization problems, the objective function f are separable, that is, the sum of many summand-functions each with its own argument:

 

For example, problems of linear optimization are separable. For a separable problem, we consider an optimal solution

 

with the minimum value   For a separable problem, we consider an optimal solution  (xmin, f(xmin))
to the "convexified problem", where convex hulls are taken of the graphs of  the summand functions. Such an optimal solution is the limit of a sequence of points in the convexified problem

  An application of the Shapley–Folkman lemma represents the given optimal-point as a sum of points in the graphs of the original summands and of a small number of convexified summands.

This analysis was published by Ivar Ekeland in 1974 to explain the apparent convexity of separable problems with many summands, despite the non-convexity of the summand problems. In 1973, the young mathematician Claude Lemaréchal was surprised by his success with convex minimization methods on problems that were known to be non-convex. Ekeland's analysis explained the success of methods of convex minimization on large and separable problems, despite the non-convexities of the summand functions. The  Shapley–Folkman lemma has encouraged the use of methods of convex minimization on other applications with sums of many functions.

Bibliography

Research
  (Corrected reprinting of the 1976 North-Holland ed.)

The book is cited over 500 times in MathSciNet.
 
 
  (Reprint of the 1984 Wiley ed.)

Exposition for a popular audience

See also
 Jonathan M. Borwein ("smooth" variational principle)
 Robert R. Phelps (a "grandfather" of variational principles)
 David Preiss ("smooth" variational principle)

Notes

External links

Ekeland's webpage at CEREMADE
 Conference on "Economics and Mathematics" by Ivar Ekeland, held at Canal U (2000)
 Ekeland's Curriculum vitae

Variational analysts
Functional analysts
Mathematical economists
20th-century French mathematicians
21st-century French mathematicians
Canadian mathematicians
French people of Norwegian descent
Canadian people of Norwegian descent
Canadian people of French descent
1944 births
Living people
École Normale Supérieure alumni
Academic staff of the University of British Columbia
Canada Research Chairs
Textbook writers